The Third Aliyah (HaAliyah HaShlishit) refers to the third wave—or aliyah—of modern Jewish immigration to Palestine from Europe. This wave lasted from 1919, just after the end of World War I, until 1923, at the start of an economic crisis in Palestine.

History

Approximately 40,000 Jews arrived in Palestine during the Third Aliyah. The bellwether of the Third Aliyah was the ship SS Ruslan, which arrived at Jaffa Port on December 19, 1919 carrying over 600 new immigrants and people returning after being stranded in Europe during the war.

The Third Aliyah was triggered by the October Revolution in Russia, anti-semitic pogroms in Eastern Europe and the Balfour Declaration. The pioneers of the Third Aliyah originated mainly from Eastern European countries: 45% from Russia, 31% from Poland, 5% from Romania, and three percent from Lithuania.

Most of the newcomers were young halutzim (pioneers), who built roads and towns and commenced the draining of marshes in the Jezreel Valley and the Hefer Plain. Afterwards they became a smaller proportion of the immigrants. The importance of those pioneers was just as great as that of the pioneers of the Second Aliyah. Their ideology contributed a great deal to the construction of Palestine, and so they imprinted their mark on Zionism and also on the development of the Jewish settlements in Palestine.

The Histadrut Labor Federation was established at this time.

Motivation
Immigrants had high hopes for a new future in the Holy Land, but more than that, they were pushed to immigrate due to the developments in Europe and the growth of the nationalism aspirations of various minority groups. Several factors motivated the immigrants:
 The Balfour Declaration, which stated Britain's support for use of the Palestine mandate as a "national home for the Jewish people".
 The Russian Revolution and Russian Civil War led to a wave of pogroms. An estimated 100,000 Jews were killed and 500,000 left homeless.
 Upheaval in Europe in the aftermath of World War I with nationalist awakenings amongst the eastern European nations following the birth of nine new countries.
 In the new countries which were formed after World War I there was the "problem of the minorities". Battles erupted between small ethnic groups, with riots in divided countries like Poland.
 An economic crisis in Europe
 The enactment of Emergency Quota Act, which limited immigration to the United States
 The relative success of the absorption of the Second Aliyah to Israel and the socialist ideologies of the wave.

The official Zionist institutions were opposed to the third immigration wave. They feared that the country would not be able to absorb such a great number of people. They even requested that only people who had enough economic resources come to the country. However, the harsh reality changed their expectations: the bad economic situation of Jews of Eastern Europe, and also the riots, forced many to emigrate to countries which did open their gates—the United States and Western Europe—and to those who had a pioneering impulse and a Zionist recognition, Palestine was suitable as their new home.

Social makeup
Many of the new immigrants of the Third Aliyah were affiliated with HeHalutz and Hashomer Hatzair. Yitzhak Lamdan and Uri Zvi Greenberg immigrated to Palestine during the Third Aliyah.

Personalities
 Baruch Agadati, dancer and choreographer; immigrated 1919 on board the Ruslan
 Rachel Bluwstein, known as "Rachel the Poetess"; returned 1919 on board the Ruslan
 Menachem Ussishkin, Zionist leader; immigrated 1919 on board the Ruslan
 Joseph Constant, sculptor, painter and novelist immigrated in 1919 on board the Ruslan with his wife
 Henya Pekelman, Zionist pioneer, woman manual laborer, women's equality activist partisan and rape victim; the autobiography she wrote provides a rare documentation of daily life in Eretz-Yisra'el of those times

References

Third
Aliyah 3
Aliyah